Elim Fellowship is a North American–based Pentecostal/charismatic Christian Ministry founded in 1933. Elim Fellowship's headquarters is located in Lima, NY.

History 
Elim Bible Institute was founded in 1924 by Ivan Q. Spencer and his wife Minnie Spencer in Hornell, New York. Spencer, a young minister, had a vision to train ministers to work in revival and renewal movements. The Elim Fellowship began a few years later in 1933 as the Elim Ministerial Fellowship, an informal fellowship of ministers who had graduated from Elim Bible Institute. In 1947, this loose network was incorporated as Elim Missionary Assemblies. In 1972 the name Elim Fellowship was officially adopted. Elim, describing itself as a "worldwide revival fellowship", serves, supports, and networks pastors, missionaries, churches, and other ministers and ministries. The Elim Fellowship of Evangelical Churches and Ministers (Canada) was incorporated in 1982.

The administrative headquarters of the fellowship are located near the campus of Elim Bible Institute in Lima, New York.

As of 1997, Elim Fellowship reported 190 member churches with an estimated membership of 21,000.

Beliefs 
The Elim Fellowship holds membership in the Evangelical Council for Financial Accountability, the National Association of Evangelicals, Pentecostal/Charismatic Churches of North America, and the International Pentecostal Association.

The fellowship describes itself as being "of Pentecostal conviction and Charismatic orientation". According to the denomination's official Statement of Faith, Elim Fellowship believes that the Holy Bible is the divinely inspired word of God; that God exists eternally as one being of three coequal persons; that humankind is lost and in need of a savior; that eternal salvation comes through the atoning death of Jesus Christ and spiritual regeneration by the Holy Spirit; that divine healing is provided through atonement; and that the personal bodily return of Jesus Christ is imminent. Church government is congregational. The decision making body of the fellowship is the Council of Elders. New elders are chosen by the existing elder body and affirmed in annual session.

Colleges/institutes 
 Elim Bible Institute & College - Lima, New York
  Elim Bible Institute - Buffalo - Orchard Park, New York

References
Encyclopedia of American Religions, J. Gordon Melton, editor 
Handbook of Denominations in the United States, by Frank S. Mead, Samuel S. Hill, and Craig D. Atwood
"Ivan Spencer, Willow in the Wind", by Marion Meloon
Elim Fellowship website

External links

Christian organizations established in 1933
Pentecostal denominations established in the 20th century
Pentecostal denominations in North America
Finished Work Pentecostals
1933 establishments in the United States
Members of the National Association of Evangelicals
Evangelical denominations in North America
Pentecostal denominations
Christian organizations
Christian denominations